Cinnamon loach may also refer to:
Pangio oblonga
Pangio pangia